Amel Charrouf (born November 21, 1990, in Algiers) is an Algerian volleyball player.

Clubs
  current club :  GSP (ex MC Alger)
  previous club:  Com Argenteuil
  previous club :  RIJA Alger
  previous club:  GSP (ex MC Alger)

References

1990 births
Living people
Volleyball players from Algiers
Algerian women's volleyball players
Expatriate volleyball players in France
Algerian expatriates in France
21st-century Algerian people